The Brazil Swimming Trophy (Formerly: Maria Lenk Trophy) is a Brazilian competition played by teams in individual and relay swimming events. It is also known as the Brazilian Open Summer Championship and / or Brazilian Open Long Course Pool Championship. It is one of the most notable events nationwide.

Its first edition took place in 1962 in Porto Alegre and had Club Athlético Paulistano as champion. The most recent edition took place in the city of Rio de Janeiro in December 2020. The trophy is marked by the hegemony of the clubs in the states of Rio de Janeiro, São Paulo and Minas Gerais. The main winners are: Esporte Clube Pinheiros with 18 titles, Clube de Regatas do Flamengo with 13, and Minas Tênis Clube with 10.

History

2012 
In 2012, the Clube de Regatas do Flamengo became champion, after a decade, with 2152.5 points. The Trophy was won after a fight with Esporte Clube Pinheiros (2070 points) and Sport Club Corinthians Paulista (1939.5 points), respectively, second and third places. Minas Tennis Club came in fourth (1812 points).

2016 
In 2016, the Brazil Swimming Trophy was used as test event for the 2016 Summer Olympics. In the event, aquatic timing systems, swimming pools, ventilation systems and the infrastructure of the Olympic Aquatic Stadium in Barra da Tijuca could be tested.

2020 
In 2020, the Brazil Swimming Trophy was the first national event to happen after the COVID-19 Pandemic. Originally the championship should have been held in April, but it had to be postponed to December to comply with sanitary measures imposed by Brazilian government entities.

Champion by Year

Meet records

Long course (50 m)

Men

Women

Short course (25 m)

Men

Women

References 

Swimming competitions in Brazil